Phytosanitary may refer to:
Phytosanitary certification
Phytosanitary inspection
Phytosanitary irradiation
Phytosanitary quarantine
Sanitary and phytosanitary measures and agreements
Phytosanitary regulation
Agreement on the Application of Sanitary and Phytosanitary Measures of the WTO Uruguay Round
Risk Assessment under the Sanitary and Phytosanitary Agreement
Phytosanitary Certificate Issuance and Tracking System of the USDA
Commission on Phytosanitary Measures of the FAO IPPC
International Standards For Phytosanitary Measures No. 15 of the IPPC